This is a list of qualifying teams for the 2021 NCAA Division I men's basketball tournament. A total of 68 teams participated in the tournament. 31 of the teams earned automatic bids by winning their conference tournaments; normally, this would be 32 teams, but the Ivy League cancelled play for this season. The remaining 37 (normally 36) teams were granted at-large bids, which were extended by the NCAA Selection Committee. All teams were seeded 1 to 16 within their regions, while the Selection Committee seeded the entire field from 1 to 68.

Automatic bids
Seeds listed were seeds within the conference tournaments. Conference championship runners-up in bold face were given at-large berths.

At-large bids

Listed by region and seeding

Conferences with multiple bids

Bids by state

References

NCAA Division I men's basketball tournament qualifying teams
 
qualifying teams